Rychtal  is a village in Kępno County, Greater Poland Voivodeship, in west-central Poland. It is the seat of the gmina (administrative district) called Gmina Rychtal.

Geography

History
A former Slavic settlement at the site called Będłowice or Bandlowice is documented in 1222, when the estates were held by the Teutonic Order. From 1233 onwards, the Silesian duke Henry the Bearded opened the remote area to German and Walloon colonists in the course of the mediaeval Ostsiedlung migration. Their settlement Reichthal ("Rich Valley") was first mentioned as a town in 1294, then a possession of the Bishops of Wrocław. It replaced the older Slavic locality, nevertheless, due to the proximity of the episcopal lands to Greater Poland, the Rychtal area remained bilingual with both German and Polish speaking populations and predominantly Catholic.

After the secularization of the Bishopric's estates under Prussian rule in 1810, Rychtal belonged to the Namslau district of the Silesia Province. After the German defeat in World War I, the area (Reichthaler Ländchen) was allocated to the Greater Polish Poznań Voivodeship of the Second Polish Republic by the 1919 Treaty of Versailles. The adjacent area of the Namslau district around Noldau (present-day Domaszowice) in the south was included in the 1921 Upper Silesia plebiscite with 97.6% of the votes being cast for Germany.

Rychtal lost town privileges in 1934. In the course of the 1939 Invasion of Poland, it was again occupied by Nazi Germany as part of the "Reichsgau Wartheland", attended with persecutions of the Polish speaking inhabitants. The area was overrun by the Red Army in the course of the Vistula–Oder Offensive in January 1945 and restored to the Republic of Poland.

References

External links

Rychtal